Sigfox was a French global network operator founded in 2010 that built wireless networks to connect low-power objects such as electricity meters and smartwatches, which need to be continuously on and emitting small amounts of data.

Sigfox was based in Labège near Toulouse, France, and had over 375 employees. The firm also had offices in Madrid, San Francisco, Sydney and Paris.

Sigfox had raised more than $300 million from investors that included Salesforce, Intel, Samsung, NTT, SK Telecom, energy groups Total and Air Liquide.  In November 2016 Sigfox was valued at around €600 million.  In January 2022 Sigfox filed for bankruptcy. 

In April 2022 Singapore-based IoT network firm Unabiz subsequently acquired Sigfox and its French network operations for a reported €25 million ($27m).

Technology
Sigfox employs the differential binary phase-shift keying (DBPSK) and the Gaussian frequency shift keying (GFSK) that enables communication using the Short-range device band of 868 MHz in Europe, and the Industrial, Scientific and Medical radio band of 902 MHz in the US. It utilizes a wide-reaching signal that passes freely through solid objects, called "Ultra Narrowband" and requires little energy, being termed a "low-power wide-area network" (LPWAN). The network is based on one-hop star topology and requires a mobile operator to carry the generated traffic. The signal can also be used to easily cover large areas and to reach underground objects. As of November 2020, the Sigfox IoT network has covered a total of 5.8 million square kilometers in a total of 72 countries with 1.3 billion of the world population reached.

Sigfox has partnered with a number of firms in the LPWAN industry such as Texas Instruments, Silicon Labs and ON Semiconductor. The ISM radio bands support limited bidirectional communication. The existing standard for Sigfox communications supports up to 140 uplink messages a day, each of which can carry a payload of 12 octets at a data rate of up to 100 bits per second.

Coverage 
 Map of coverage and countries under roll-out

References

Internet technology companies of France
Internet of things companies
Wireless networking
French companies established in 2009